Leucogoniella is a genus of moths in the family Gelechiidae described by Thomas Bainbrigge Fletcher in 1940.

Species
 Leucogoniella californica (Keifer, 1930)
 Leucogoniella distincta (Keifer, 1935)
 Leucogoniella subsimella (Clemens, 1860)

References

Anacampsini